Star Wars Republic Commando: True Colors is the third novel in the Republic Commando series, written by Karen Traviss. It is a sequel to Hard Contact and Triple Zero and continues the story of Omega Squad's actions during the Clone Wars.

Plot
At the beginning of the story, Sergeant Walon Vau, now destitute of his military status, and Delta Squad are found on the frozen planet of Mygeeto. It is explained that Vau, though reluctant to take the Deltas with him, is planning on “liberating” some funds from his family vault. After taking a sum of 55 million credits Vau and the Delta's attempt to escape before being caught. Their escape attempt goes awry and leads to Vau being trapped under a large amount of ice, slowly dying of hypothermia.
During this time, Omega squad is being launched via jetpack to the planet Graftikaar. Once landed, they meet with Null ARC trooper A’Den and the Graftikaar insurgency formed by a humanoid lizard species.

At the same time, Sergeant Kal Skirata is haggling with a Rodian merchant for a submersible-flight capable ship. It is discovered that he plans on using this to track down the former head Kaminoan scientist, Ko Sai. It is explained that Ko Sai had deserted the republic and had taken a large sum of money, as well as her research. It is also revealed that Skirata is attempting to capture Ko Sai, so that he may create a cure for the clones accelerated aging, which will eventually lead them to die at an early age. Skirata and Ordo receive a message from Delta Squad explaining what has occurred to Vau. Skirata and Ordo go to Mygeeto where they rescue Vau. Vau gives everything but a pair of earrings to Skirata for the clone retirement fund. Ordo is given the earrings to give to Besany Wennen, whom he is in a relationship with.

On Graftikaar, Darman and Atin are infiltrating a city on Graftikaar. In the city they discover ARC trooper Sull, a previously believed to be missing. Darman and Atin capture him and bring him back to the camp, where A’Den releases Sull. Darman then goes to Sull's apartment where he is assaulted by clone covert operations troopers.
During the final assault on the capital of Graftikaar, Fi is injured in an explosion. It is revealed that it is a concussion and that he is brain dead and therefore is to be terminated. Skirata arranges to send Fi to a medical facility on Coruscant where he is scheduled to be terminated. Besany Wennen attempts to stop this from happening, and manages to delay the termination until CSF officer Jaller Obrim arrives and takes Fi to his home.

Meanwhile, on Qiluura Etain Tur-Mukan is tasked with removing all the colonists from the planet. She does so but is forced to use aggressive actions after the colonists are not willing to surrender. After the battle she starts miscarrying Darman's child. She sends a distress call to Skirata who sends Ordo to help her. Ordo stabilizes the child and then takes Etain with her to meet up with Skirata, Vau and Null ARC Mereel who replaced Ordo while he was with Etain. Skirata finds Ko Sai in an underwater lab and takes her and her research before detonating the lab.

On the ship, Ordo gets enraged by Ko Sai's unwillingness to cooperate that he takes the drive with all her research and destroys it. Skirata is horrified but sets a course for Mandalore.  Once there, Etain gives birth to a son named Venku. Skirata then goes to Coruscant to pick up Fi.

Once arrived on Coruscant Skirata finds out that Bardan Jusik has been attempting to accelerate Fi's healing. Upon his return Skirata discovers that Ko Sai has committed suicide. Skirata is devastated that they now no longer have any means of slowing the clones’ aging, but Mereel reveals that he had made copies and was merely bluffing.

Characters 
Mandalorian:
 Sergeant Kal Skirata, Mercenary (Male Human)
 Sergeant Walon Vau, Mercenary (Male Human)
 Rav Bralor, Bounty Hunter (Female Human)

Republic Commandos:

Omega Squad:
 RC-1309 Niner
 RC-1136 Darman
 RC-8015 Fi
 RC-3222 Atin

Delta Squad:
 RC-1138 Boss
 RC-1262 Scorch
 RC-1140 Fixer
 RC-1207 Sev

ARC Troopers:
 Null ARC N-11 Captain Ordo
 Null ARC N-7 Lieutenant Mereel
 Null ARC N-10 Lieutenant Jaing
 Null ARC N-12 Sergeant A'den
 ARC A-26 Captain Maze
 ARC A-30 Lieutenant Sull

Jedi:
 Etain Tur-Mukan, Jedi Knight (Female Human)
 Bardan Jusik, Jedi Knight (Male Human)
 Arligan Zey, Jedi Master, Director of Republic Special Forces (Male Human)

Others:
 Clone Trooper CT-5108/8843 Corr
 Clone Commander CC-3388/0021 Levet, 35th Infantry Battalion
 Clone Trooper Sergeant Barlex, 2nd Airborne Company, 212th Battalion
 Captain Jaller Obrim, Coruscant Security Force (Male Human)
 Agent Besany Wennen, Republic Treasury Investigator (Female Human)
 Jinart, Qiiluran Spy (Female Gurlanin)

Release 
True colors was published on October 30, 2007.

See also

 Star Wars: Republic Commando

References

External links
 Wookieepedia
 Official Website of Karen Traviss
 Official Star Wars Website

Republic Commando
2007 British novels
2007 science fiction novels
Republic Commando: True Colors
English novels
Del Rey books